Joseph Shih or Ting Joseph Shih is a Taiwanese diplomat and politician. He was the nation's representative to South Korea from 2014 to 2018, and the Deputy Minister of the Ministry of Foreign Affairs of the Executive Yuan from 2013 to 2014.

ROC Foreign Affairs Deputy Ministry

2013 Korean crisis
During the 2013 North Korean crisis, in mid April 2013 Shih said that the ROC government had no plan to immediately evacuate the more than 16,000 Taiwanese citizens then living in South Korea. He added that the Taipei Mission in Korea had prepared a task force and was ready for any possible scenario.

Taiwanese fisherman shooting incident
After the shooting incident of a Taiwanese fisherman by a Philippine government vessel on 9 May 2013 in disputed waters in the South China Sea, Shih was told that the shooting was a warning shot to drive the Taiwanese vessel out of the disputed water. However, he rejected that it was warning shooting because the ROC Coast Guard Administration discovered 32 bullet holes in the Taiwanese vessel. He then summoned Antonio Basilio, Philippine Representative to Taiwan, to explain the Philippine stance on the matter. He also demanded the Philippine government officially apologize over the killing instead of only expressing regret.

References

Ambassadors of Taiwan to Belize
Representatives of Taiwan to New Zealand
Living people
Taiwanese Ministers of Foreign Affairs
Year of birth missing (living people)
National Chengchi University alumni